Castletimon Ogham Stone (CIIC 047) is an ogham stone and National Monument located near Brittas Bay, County Wicklow, Ireland.

Location

Potter's River flows  to the south.

History

Castletimon Ogham Stone was carved c. AD 350–550, and was rediscovered in 1854.

Local legend claims that the Ogham stone was once picked up by the Castletimon Giant and thrown down the hill; the scratches on it were left by his finger nails. Another says that a local man took the Ogham stone to use as a hob stone. The Aos Sí (fairies) got angry and made his cutlery dance and jiggle. After a week of this he returned the stone to its place.

Description

Castletimon Ogham Stone measures 150 × 48 × 20 cm and has Ogham carvings incised on one edge.  (NETACARI NETA CAGI, perhaps "Netacari, nephew of Cagi"). Variant readings include NETACARI NETACAMI, QEVASARI QEVASAGI or NETACARI SETACAGI.

References

National Monuments in County Wicklow
Ogham inscriptions